McGinlay is a surname. Notable people with the surname include:

Brian McGinlay (born 1945), Scottish football referee
Craig McGinlay, British actor
Jim McGinlay (born 1949), Scottish bass guitarist
John McGinlay (born 1964), Scottish footballer
Pat McGinlay (born 1967), Scottish footballer